Saar was a  cargo ship that was built in 1937 by Stettiner Oderwerke AG, Stettin for German owners. She was seized by the Allies at Kolding, Denmark in May 1945, passed to the Ministry of War Transport (MoWT) and renamed Empire Congleton. In 1946, she was passed to the Soviet Union and renamed Donetz (Донец).

Description
The ship was built in 1937 by Stettiner Oderwerke AG, Stettin.

She had a GRT of 1,026 and a NRT of 560.

The engine was built by Ottensener Maschinenbau GmbH, Altona.

History
Saar was built for R C Gribel. Her port of registry was Stettin and she used the Code Letters DAYW. In February 1945, Saar was one of the ship involved in the transportation of refugees from Pillau, Soviet Union to Swinemünde, Germany. In May 1945, Saar was seized by the Allies at Kolding, Denmark. She was passed to the MoWT and renamed Empire Congleton. Her port of registry was changed to London. She was allocated the Code Letters GNML and the United Kingdom Official Number 180703. In 1946 she was passed to the Soviet Union and renamed Donetz.

References

External links
Photo of Donetz

1937 ships
Ships built in Stettin
Steamships of Germany
Merchant ships of Germany
World War II merchant ships of Germany
Ministry of War Transport ships
Empire ships
Steamships of the United Kingdom
Merchant ships of the United Kingdom
Steamships of the Soviet Union
Merchant ships of the Soviet Union
Soviet Union–United Kingdom relations
Germany–Soviet Union relations